Dorymyrmex pyramicus is a species of ant in the genus Dorymyrmex. Described by Roger in 1863, the species is found in many countries of South America.

References

Dorymyrmex
Hymenoptera of South America
Insects described in 1863